The Arab–Israeli alliance, sometimes called the Israeli–Sunni alliance, refers to an unofficial security coalition comprising Israel and various Arab countries. Formed in the interest of the Gulf Cooperation Council, it is primarily focused on deterring the political and military ambitions of Iran (see Iran–Saudi Arabia proxy conflict and Iran–Israel proxy conflict), and has been actively promoted by the United States since the February 2019 Warsaw conference. It has also notably paved the way for Arab–Israeli normalization, as seen with the Abraham Accords and other follow-up agreements.

History
The roots of the alliance started in the 2000s, due to the decreasing importance of the Israeli–Palestinian conflict as a wedge issue and mutual tensions with Iran. By 2016, GCC states had sought strengthened economic and security cooperation with Israel, which is involved in its own proxy conflict with Iran. The de facto coalition emerged by November 2017, upon warming ties between Israel and the Gulf States and received broad media attention in light of the February 2019 Warsaw Conference, "This week's global summit in Warsaw will test the main pillar of the Trump administration's policy in the Middle East: The belief that Israel and key Arab states can form an alliance against Iran, even when peace talks between Israel and the Palestinians seem more distant than ever."

The Trump administration tried to launch a "Middle East Strategic Alliance" (also known as the "Arab NATO") including the GCC states, Egypt, Jordan, and possibly Morocco. In April 2019 Egypt announced that it would not participate. The pact has not been announced as of 11 January 2021. "The late 2020 UAE, Bahrain, and Morocco agreements to normalize relations with Israel could have constituted an alternative, insofar as the UAE and Bahrain normalization decisions were related, at least in part, to countering Iran." In 2020, as part of the Abraham Accords, various countries normalized relations with Israel, these countries were: the United Arab Emirates, Bahrain, Sudan, and Morocco. The Marshall Center analysed the Abraham Accords in October 2020, including the involvement of the United Arab Emirates and Bahrain, but before Sudan and Morocco took action; the Marshall Center described that the Abraham Accords "strengthens the informal anti-Iran alliance in the region".

According to authors Yoel Gozansky an Iran expert at the Institute for National Security Studies, a Tel Aviv think tank, and professor Clive Jones, a Middle East security specialist:
"Our approach lies in understanding Israel's ties with many of the Gulf monarchies, notably Saudi Arabia, the UAE, and Bahrain, not as some formal alliance but rather as a manifestation of a Tacit Security Regime. This regime allows for the evolution of ties between Israel and the Gulf monarchies to be explored and analyzed while allowing us to be mindful that these relations have rarely been linear, let alone underpinned by any shared normative values."

In an anniversary analysis of the Abraham Accords, Haaretz said that the accords were premised on the idea of an "Israel-Sunni" anti-Iran coalition and that normalization would help but that "it's very doubtful there ever was such a coalition, and the accords did nothing to create or solidify one." In March 2022, Saudi Crown Prince Mohammed bin Salman said reconciliation talks with Iran would continue and "We look at Israel as a potential ally but before that it should solve its problems with the Palestinians,"

Negev Summit 2022

A summit at Sde Boker was hosted by Israeli foreign minister Yair Lapid on 27–28 March 2022. Attending were his American, Bahraini, Egyptian, Emirati and Moroccan counterparts. Nasser Bourita of Morocco made a "historic" first visit to Israel, and also met with Blinken, relaying a message from his majesty King Mohammed VI, that "when we reestablished the relations [with Israel], this is not an opportunistic move, it is a move of conviction,” and promised more formal visits between the two countries’ officials, which will advance cooperation and ties further. Bourita said, “We are here today because we genuinely, sincerely, and deeply believe in peace.” Royal Air Morocco had opened direct flights to Tel Aviv earlier in the month.

US secretary of state Antony Blinken attended the first day and released a joint statement with minister Lapid, saying that "the US believes the JCPOA is the best way to put Iran back in the box."  However, “when it comes to the most important element, we see eye-to-eye,” Blinken said. “We are both committed, both determined that Iran will never acquire a nuclear weapon… Our commitment to the core principle that Iran can never acquire a nuclear weapon is unwavering. One way or another, we will continue to cooperate closely.”   Comparing the Negev Summit to the Camp David Accords which "no one thought possible", Blinken called this the beginning of a "new dawn" for the region.

In response to the recent terror attack in Hadera that killed two Israelis at a bus stop, all participants condemned it.  They decided to make the Negev summit a regular annual conference, and invite other regional partners, including the Palestinians, with Lapid saying, "We are today opening a door before all the peoples of the region, including the Palestinians, and offering them to replace the path of terror and destruction with a shared future of progress and success."  And further, "What we are doing here is making history, building a new regional architecture based on progress, technology, religious tolerance, security and intelligence cooperation."
The Israeli-Arab alliance reached new heights when the Bahraini foreign minister openly suggested during the summit in the Negev to discuss the establishment of a security-intelligence alliance, which the Bahraini foreign minister called a "mini-NATO", among all members of the summit countries.

See also

References

 
Iran–Israel proxy conflict
Iran–Saudi Arabia proxy conflict
2020 in international relations
2020 in Israel
2020 in Bahrain
2020 in the United Arab Emirates
21st-century military alliances
Geopolitical rivalry
Gulf Cooperation Council
Bahrain–Israel relations
Bahrain–Iran relations
Bahrain–United States relations
Iran–Israel military relations
Iran–Saudi Arabia relations
Iran–United Arab Emirates relations
Iran–United States relations
Israel–Saudi Arabia relations
Israel–United Arab Emirates relations
Israel–United States military relations
Saudi Arabia–Sudan relations
Saudi Arabia–United States relations
United Arab Emirates–United States relations
Military alliances involving Bahrain
Military alliances involving Israel
Military alliances involving Saudi Arabia
Military alliances involving the United Arab Emirates
Military alliances involving the United States